Roche was an electoral division of Cornwall in the United Kingdom which returned one member to sit on Cornwall Council between 2009 and 2021. It was abolished at the 2021 local elections, being succeeded by Roche and Bugle.

Councillors

Extent
Roche represented the villages of Whitemoor, Roche, Belowda and Bilberry, and the hamlets of Trezaise, Carbis, Tregoss and Victoria. The division was affected by boundary changes at the 2013 election. From 2009 to 2013, the division covered 3081 hectares in total; from 2013 to 2021, it covered 3,177 hectares.

Election results

2017 election

2013 election

2009 election

References

Electoral divisions of Cornwall Council